Dominic Alfred Principe (February 9, 1917 – April 9, 2010) was an American football player. He played college football for Fordham and professional football for the New York Giants and Brooklyn Dodgers.

Early years
Principe was born in 1917 in Brockton, Massachusetts, and attended Brockton High School.

Fordham
He played college football for the Fordham Rams football team from 1936 to 1939.  He was selected by the Associated Press (AP) as a first-team back on the 1939 All-Eastern football team. He was also selected by the AP, United Press and Newspaper Enterprise Association as a third-team fullback on the 1939 College Football All-America Team.

Professional football and military service
Principe was drafted by the New York Giants with the 80th pick in the 1940 NFL Draft and played for the Giants during the 1940, 1941, and 1942 NFL seasons. His football career was then interrupted by service in the Navy during World War II. After the war, he played for the Brooklyn Dodgers of the All-American Football Conference (AAFC) during the 1946 season. He appeared in a total of 34 NFL and AAFC  games, nine of them as a starter. He tallied 152 rushing yards, 112 receiving yards, scored two touchdowns, and intercepted one pass.

Later years
Principe died in 2010 in Jupiter, Florida.

References 

1917 births
2007 deaths
American football fullbacks
Fordham Rams football players
New York Giants players
Brooklyn Dodgers
Players of American football from Illinois
Sportspeople from Brockton, Massachusetts